Pterogonia episcopalis is a moth of the family Nolidae first described by Charles Swinhoe in 1891. It has been described as being from the Indian subcontinent.

Description 
Pterogonia episcopaliss head and thorax are violaceous grey with a few brown scales. Its abdomen is pale brown with slight whitish segmental hues. The claspers are fringed with rufous hair. The ventral surface is whitish except towards the extremity of the species.

References 

Nolidae
Moths described in 1891
Taxa named by Charles Swinhoe